The stadion (plural stadia, ; latinized as stadium), also anglicized as stade, was an ancient Greek unit of length, consisting of 600 Ancient Greek feet (podes).

Calculations

According to Herodotus, one stadium was equal to 600 Greek feet (podes). However, the length of the foot varied in different parts of the Greek world, and the length of the stadion has been the subject of argument and hypothesis for hundreds of years.

An empirical determination of the length of the stadion was made by Lev Vasilevich Firsov, who compared 81 distances given by Eratosthenes and Strabo with the straight-line distances measured by modern methods, and averaged the results. Various equivalent lengths have been proposed, and some have been named. Among them are: 

Which measure of the stadion is used can affect the interpretation of ancient texts.  For example, the error in the calculation of Earth's circumference by Eratosthenes or Posidonius is dependent on which stadion is chosen to be appropriate.

Other uses
From the Middle Ages on, the word stadium has been used as a synonym for the furlong (which is 220 yards, equal to one eighth of a mile), which is of Old English origin.

See also
Ancient Egyptian units of measurement
Ancient Greek units of measurement#Length
Earth's circumference

References

Obsolete units of measurement
Ancient Greek units of measurement
Units of length
Units of measurement in surveying